Sidney Wood is a British-born retired Swedish phonetician and Research Fellow (docent).

Research
Wood’s research, based on X-ray motion films of speech (Regional Southern British English, South Swedish, Bulgarian, Colloquial Cairo Arabic, West Greenlandic Inuit) and vocal tract modelling, is widely cited. It is devoted to the following topics:

vowel production 

vowel phonology: Bulgarian, Kabardian, West Greenlandic
the gestural structure of syllables

articulator timing and coarticulation

His most significant findings are:

 four constriction locations for monophthongs (hard palate, velum, upper pharynx and lower pharynx) 
 the upper pharyngeal location of  uvular consonants originally hypothesized from CV spectral transitions. 

More recently, his research focus turned towards British regional pronunciations, especially southeastern accents of Southern British English (SBE).

Wood has been involved in a significant theoretical controversy concerning the validity of the Bell vowel model and the legitimacy of using X-ray films to contradict it. He argued that critical functions of the model are contradicted by empirical data and by acoustical theory. Catford's 1981 paper contains detailed discussion of Wood's arguments, and a partial defence of the classical vowel description that Wood's research calls into question. In his critical analysis of phonetic theory, John Laver notes "Because it is so widespread, a version of the traditional method will be described here; but  Ladefoged (1980) and Wood (1977, 1979) have proposed descriptions of tongue action which though less well known are more explanatory and less ambiguous, which are recommended to the reader who wishes to follow the matter further". Clark and Yallop write "There is no principled reason why the location of maximum tongue height should correspond directly and systematically to vowel quality (Lindau 1978, Wood 1979). Hayward summarizes Wood's theoretical position, concluding "In Wood's view, constriction location and constriction degree should also form the basis for the phonological specification of vowels. His ideas have proved attractive to some phonologists."

See also 

 List of phonetics topics
 Human voice

References

1934 births
Living people
Phoneticians
Speech perception researchers